Visitors to Laos must obtain a visa from one of the Laotian diplomatic missions or online unless they come from one of the visa exempt countries or qualify for visa on arrival. All visitors must hold a passport valid for 6 months.

Visa policy map

Visa exemption 
Citizens of the following 15 countries can visit Laos without a visa (allowed length of stay in days is shown in parentheses):

Diplomatic and service category passports

Holders of diplomatic and/or service category passports do not require a visa to visit Laos up to 30 days (unless otherwise noted).

D — diplomatic passports only

Visa waiver agreement for diplomatic passports was signed with Turkey in November 2018 and it is yet to come into force.

Visa on arrival

Visitors of other nationalities may obtain a visa on arrival valid for 30 days for a fee at most of the 27 ports of entry to the country, except:

Napao-Chalo (Vietnam)
Subhun (China)
Pakxan-Bueng Kan (Thailand)
Xieng Kok river port (Myanmar)

There have been reports that between January and June 2020 visa on arrival facility will be shut down at 9 border crossings.

The visa on arrival is extendable twice, not exceeding 90 days of stay in Laos. Extensions are handled by the province immigration office inside Laos for a fee.

Nationals of the following countries are ineligible to obtain a visa on arrival, and they can only obtain a visa on arrival if they are traveling on an official visit and are holding an official letter of guarantee issued by the Ministry of Foreign Affairs of Laos:

eVisa

Laos launched an eVisa service in July 2019.

eVisa for Laos is available to citizens of all countries except countries whose citizens are ineligible for visa on arrival. eVisa is valid for 60 days from the date of issuance and its holders may stay for up to 30 days in Laos. eVisa costs varies depending on the country and can be issued with 3 business days.

eVisa may be used to enter Laos through the following entry points:
Wattay International Airport
Thai–Lao Friendship Bridge
Luang Prabang International Airport (became available as of October 15, 2019)

Statistics
Most visitors arriving to Laos were from the following countries of nationality:

See also

Visa requirements for Laotian citizens

References

External links
Lao PDR Immigration Department

Laos
Foreign relations of Laos